1,2-Epoxybutane is an organic compound with the formula CH(O)CHCHCH.  It is a chiral epoxide  prepared by oxidation of 1-butene.

References

Epoxides